Die Pleite was a German periodical founded and edited by George Grosz, Wieland Herzfelde, and John Heartfield, which ran from 1919 to 1924. 

The magazine was part of the Berlin Dada scene and was known for its ruthless critiques of the Weimar Republic in addition to its prescient awareness of the emergence of right-wing extremism throughout Europe.

References

External links
 Cover Page

1919 establishments in Germany
1924 disestablishments in Germany
Dada
Defunct magazines published in Germany
German-language magazines
Magazines established in 1919
Magazines disestablished in 1924
Magazines published in Berlin
Weimar culture
Visual arts magazines published in Germany